The 2011 Nigerian Senate election in Enugu State was held on April 9, 2011, to elect members of the Nigerian Senate to represent Enugu State. Gilbert Nnaji representing Enugu East, Ike Ekweremadu representing Enugu West and Ayogu Eze representing Enugu North all won on the platform of Peoples Democratic Party.

Overview

Summary

Results

Enugu East 
Peoples Democratic Party candidate Gilbert Nnaji won the election, defeating other party candidates.

Enugu West 
Peoples Democratic Party candidate Ike Ekweremadu won the election, defeating other party candidates.

Enough North 
Peoples Democratic Party candidate Ayogu Eze won the election, defeating party candidates.

References 

Enugu State senatorial elections
Enugu State senatorial elections
Enugu State Senate elections